This article covers the 2016 football season in Chile.

National tournaments

Primera División

Clausura Champion: Club Deportivo Universidad Católica
Topscorer: Nicolas Castillo
Apetura Champion: TBD
Topscorer: TBD

Copa Chile

Champion: 
Topscorer:

National team results

The Chile national football team results and fixtures for 2015.

2016

Record

Goal scorers

References

External links
The official Chilean Football Association web site

Seasons in Chilean football